Vokhtoga is an urban locality (an urban-type settlement) in Gryazovetsky District of Vologda Oblast, Russia. Municipally, it is incorporated as Vokhtogskoye Urban Settlement, one of the two urban settlements in the district. Vokhtoga is located on the right bank of the Lezha River, a right tributary of the Sukhona. Population:

History
Vokhtoga was founded in 1938 to serve timber production and timber industry and obtained the status of the urban-type settlement in 1960.

Economy

Industry
Vokhtoga has a number of timber industry enterprises.

Transportation

Vokhtoga has a railway station on the railroad connecting Vologda in the north and Buy in the south. At Vokhtoga, another railroad branches off east, the Monza Railroad, built for timber transport and operated by the timber production authorities, which runs along the border of Vologda and Kostroma Oblasts. The Monza railroad crosses the district and enters Mezhdurechensky District, eventually continuing to the southeastern districts of Vologda Oblast. The plans to extend it further east to Nikolsk were never realized. The Monza Railroad has a separate station in Vokhoga, Vokhtoga-2 railway station. The headquarters of the Monzales company which owns the railroad are located in Vokhtoga.

References

Sources

Urban-type settlements in Vologda Oblast